"When" is a song by Canadian singer Shania Twain. It is the second UK release and fifth single from her third studio album, Come on Over. The song was written by Twain and her then-husband, Robert John "Mutt" Lange, and was originally released on June 1, 1998. It was the only single from Come on Over to not be released in the United States; however, it was released in Canada as a pop single in 2000. The song was included in the Come on Over Tour and in a medley for the Up! Tour. Twain has stated that "When" is her favorite song from Come On Over. "When" is also the theme song for the Japanese drama Cheap Love.

Music video
The music video for "When" was shot in New York City, and directed by Markus Blunder. It was released exclusively to the UK in August 1998, and played once in the US on CMT's Video Bio for Twain. The video starts with Twain apparently dying and becoming an angel, and then she goes around New York City, pursuing her love interest. The ending of the video shows her love interest placing a note under her door, which Twain opens to reveal an angel drawing and collapsing on her bed, mirroring the opening scene. The last scene shows Twain's angel form re-entering her body, symbolizing that she was only daydreaming the whole time. Performance scenes featuring Twain sitting on a bed singing the song are also intercut throughout the video. Her stunt double was actress Alissa Dean. Two versions of the video were released, one with the 'Original Album Version', which is more country, and one with the 'International Version', which is more pop. Both versions of the video have rarely been screened since the single release. "When" is the only video from Twain's first three albums to not be included on her compilations Come On Over: Video Collection and The Platinum Collection, although the rare 'International Version' is available on YouTube and select CD singles.

Official versions
Original Album Version (3:39)
International Version (3:39)
International Radio Edit (3:28)

Track listing

UK CD single
"When" (International Radio Edit) – 3:28
"Don't Be Stupid (You Know I Love You)" (International LP Version) – 3:34
"That Don't Impress Me Much" (International LP Version) – 3:38

UK CD Single Limited Edition
"When" (International Radio Edit) – 3:28
"You're Still The One" (Soul Solution Radio Edit) – 4:08
"You're Still The One" (Soul Solution Extended Club Mix) – 8:42
"Don't Be Stupid (You Know I Love You)" (International LP Version) – 3:37

Europe CD single
"When" (International Radio Edit) – 3:28
"You're Still The One" (Soul Solution Dance – Radio Edit) – 4:03

Japan CD single (3 Inch)
"When" – 3:39
"Don't Be Stupid (You Know I Love You)" – 3:34
"That Don't Impress Me Much" – 3:38

Chart performance
In the UK, "When" became Twain's second top twenty single. It debuted, at its peak, on June 13, 1998 at number 18. It remained on the chart for four weeks. It has sold 53,429 copies in the UK.

Charts

References

1998 singles
Shania Twain songs
Songs written by Robert John "Mutt" Lange
Song recordings produced by Robert John "Mutt" Lange
Songs written by Shania Twain
Mercury Records singles
Mercury Nashville singles
1997 songs